Kafsh Mahalleh (also Romanized as Kafsh Maḩalleh; also known as Kanesh Maḩalleh) is a village in Qaleh Qafeh Rural District, in the Central District of Minudasht County, Golestan Province, Iran. At the 2006 census, its population was 244, in 62 families.

References 

Populated places in Minudasht County